The closing ceremony of the 2004 Summer Olympics was held on 29 August 2004 21:15 EEST (UTC+3) at the Olympic Stadium, in Marousi, Greece, a suburb of Athens.

Ceremony

Victory Ceremony
The final victory ceremony was held to the three Men's marathon medallists : 

 Stefano Baldini - Gold Mebrahtom Keflezighi  - Silver Vanderlei de Lima* - Bronze

During the men's marathon, De Lima was actually lead the race to gift the final gold medal for Brazil. However, at the middle, he was attacked by Irish priest Cornelius Horan. Following that incident, he was fell to third, allowing him to receive bronze medal, the first for Brazil in this event. Afterwards, he misses Beijing 2008 four years later.  12 years later  in 2016, when Brazil was the host nation, in the opening ceremony, in honour of his brave against Horan's assault, he was awarded as the final torchbearer to lit up the Olympics' cauldron in Rio de Janeiro.

Parade of Nations

The flag bearers of 202 National Olympic Committees arrived into the stadium. The flag bearers from each participating country entered the stadium informally in a single file, ordered by order of the Greek alphabet, and behind them marched all the athletes. They were led by Greek weightlifter Pyrros Dimas and Chinese hurdler Liu Xiang, with the latter represents China as the next host nation of the games.

Speeches

Newly elected athlete members of the International Olympic Committee
The four athlete members who were elected are:
Frankie Fredericks (athletics, Namibia)
Jan Železný (athletics, Czech Republic)
Hicham El Guerrouj (athletics, Morocco)
Rania Elwani (swimming, Egypt)

Handover of the Olympic flag
Mayor of Athens Dora Bakoyannis handed over the Olympic flag as the representative of Athens 2004 to the IOC President Jacques Rogge and then passed to the Mayor of Beijing Wang Qishan. He represents the committee members of the next host city, Beijing 2008, led by Liu Qi.

Lowering the Olympic flag
Lowering of the Olympic flag and singing of the Olympic Anthem which the Greek choirs sang in Greek. The flag was raised again two years later in Turin, Italy.

Dignitaries in attendance

Dignitaries from International organizations
 International  Olympic Committee – 
President of the IOC Jacques Rogge and wife Anne Rogge
IOC Vice President James L. Easton and wife Phyllis Easton 
IOC Member Sergey Bubka and wife Lilia Tutunik 
Former IOC President Juan Antonio Samaranch 
and Members of the International Olympic Committee

Host country dignitaries 
 Greece – 
President of the Hellenic Republic Konstantinos Stephanopoulos 
President's Adjutant of the Hellenic Air Force Colonel Georgios Dritsakos 
ATHOC President Gianna Angelopoulos-Daskalaki & husband Theodore Angelopoulos
Prime Minister of Greece Kostas Karamanlis & wife Natasa Pazaïti
Ex-Prime Minister Costas Simitis
President of the Panhellenic Socialist Movement and Leader of the Opposition George Papandreou 
Mayor Dora Bakoyannis

Foreign Dignitaries from abroad
 Spain – 
Queen Sofía of Spain
Infanta Elena, Duchess of Lugo 
Infanta Cristina of Spain
H.R.H. Crown Prince Felipe and wife Princess Letizia
 Belgium – 
H.R.H. Prince Philippe and wife H.R.H. Princess Mathilde
 Sweden – 
King of Sweden Carl XVI Gustaf and wife Queen Silvia of Sweden
 Estonia –
President of Estonia Arnold Rüütel and First Lady of Estonia Ingrid Rüütel
 China – Wang Qishan, mayor of Beijing, represents the government of the People's Republic of China and the 2008 Olympics committee members

Anthems
 National Anthem of Greece
 National Anthem of the People's Republic of China
 Olympic Hymn (Greek)
 National Anthem of Italy

Notes

References

External links

Closing Ceremony
Ceremonies in Greece
Olympics closing ceremonies